Julio César Lorenzini Rangel (born 2 October 1977) is a Mexican politician and lawyer . Since 2012 he has served as Deputy of the LXII Legislature of the Mexican Congress representing Puebla .

References

1977 births
Living people
21st-century Mexican lawyers
21st-century Mexican politicians
Deputies of the LXII Legislature of Mexico
Members of the Chamber of Deputies (Mexico) for Puebla